Dipha is a monotypic snout moth genus described by N. Arakaki and Yutaka Yoshiyasu in 1988. Its single species, Dipha aphidivora, was described by Edward Meyrick in 1934. It is found in India, China, Malaysia, the Philippines, Taiwan, Java and Japan.

References

Phycitini
Monotypic moth genera
Moths of Asia
Pyralidae genera